Everything I Play is Funky is an album by jazz saxophonist Lou Donaldson recorded for the Blue Note label featuring Donaldson with Blue Mitchell, Lonnie Smith, Melvin Sparks, Jimmy Lewis and Idris Muhammad and two tracks with Eddie Williams and Charles Earland replacing Mitchell and Smith.

Reception
The album was awarded 3 stars in an Allmusic review by Steve Huey who states "Everything I Play Is Funky is easily one of the best examples of Lou Donaldson's commercially accessible period of the late '60s and early '70s. Donaldson's forays into funk and R&B-driven soul-jazz could sometimes sound stiff, but the grooves here — which feature many of the same players — are consistently limber and unforced. And, typical of the style, the grooves (not adventurous improvisation) are what make the album tick... This is the sort of record that modern-day Donaldson disciples like the Sugarman Three cherish, and one of his few truly consistent efforts in this style. Recommended wholeheartedly to funk and rare-groove fans".

Track listing
All compositions by Lou Donaldson except as noted
 "Everything I Do Gonh Be Funky (From Now On)" (Allen Toussaint) - 5:31
 "Hamp's Hump" (Paul Hampton) - 6:40
 "Over the Rainbow" (Harold Arlen, E.Y. "Yip" Harburg) - 7:11
 "Donkey Walk" - 6:44
 "West Indian Daddy" - 6:30
 "Minor Bash" - 6:15

Recorded on August 22, 1969 (4-5) and January 9, 1970 (1-3 & 6).

Personnel

Musicians

Lou Donaldson - varitone alto saxophone, voice
Blue Mitchell (tracks 1-3 & 6), Eddie Williams (tracks 4 & 5) - trumpet
Lonnie Smith (tracks 1-3 & 6), Charles Earland (tracks 4 & 5) - Hammond organ
Melvin Sparks - guitar
Jimmy Lewis  - Fender bass (tracks 1-3 & 6)
Idris Muhammad - drums

Production
Producer – Francis Wolff
Recording - Rudy Van Gelder
Cover design - Bob Venosa/ Havona
Cover design (reissue) – Patrick Roques
Photography - Charles Keddie

References

Lou Donaldson albums
1970 albums
Albums produced by Francis Wolff
Blue Note Records albums
Albums recorded at Van Gelder Studio